Agde is a commune in the Hérault department in Southern France. It is the Mediterranean port of the Canal du Midi.

Location

The Canal du Midi connects to the Hérault river at the Agde Round Lock ("L'Écluse Ronde d'Agde") just north of Agde, and the Hérault flows into the Mediterranean at Le Grau d'Agde. Agde station has high speed rail connections to Paris and Perpignan, and regional services to Narbonne, Montpellier and Avignon.

History

Foundation

Agde (525 BCE) is one of the oldest towns in France, after Béziers (575 BCE) and Marseille (600 BCE).
Agde (Agathe Tyche, "good fortune") was a 5th-century BCE Greek colony settled by Phocaeans from Massilia. The Greek name was Agathe. The symbol of the city, the bronze Ephebe of Agde, of the 4th century BCE, recovered from the fluvial sands of the Hérault, was joined in December 2001 by two Early Imperial Roman bronzes, of a child and of Eros, which had possibly been on their way to a villa in Gallia Narbonensis when they were lost in a shipwreck.

Development

In the history of Roman Catholicism in France, the Council of Agde was held 10 September 506 at Agde, under the presidency of Caesarius of Arles. It was attended by thirty-five bishops, and its forty-seven genuine canons dealt "with ecclesiastical discipline". One of its canons (the seventh), forbidding ecclesiastics to sell or alienate the property of the church from which they derived their living, seems to be the earliest mention of the later system of benefices.

Population

Agde's inhabitants are called Agathois.

Architecture

Agde is known for the distinctive black basalt used in local buildings such as the cathedral of Saint Stephen, built in the 12th century to replace a 9th-century Carolingian edifice built on the foundations of a fifth-century Roman church.

Bishop Guillaume fortified the cathedral's precincts and provided it with a 35-metre donjon (keep). The Romanesque cloister of the cathedral was demolished in 1857.

Jewish community
It is assumed that a Jewish community was established in the town around the sixth century AD. During the council of Agde, assembled by the Catholic church in 506 AD, Christian laymen and ecclesiastics were prohibited from eating with Jews or hosting them. This prohibition suggests that the town Jews held good relations with their town neighbours. It is also assumed that the Jewish community was never large, since it did not own a cemetery and buried their dead in Béziers, three miles away.

The Jewish name of the city was Agdi, or Akdi (אגדי). During World War II, about two thousand Jews from Germany and Austria were sent to a labour camp near the town; most were deported on 24 August 1942.

Sport and leisure

Agde has a football club RCO Agde who play at the Stade Louis Sanguin. They currently play in the Championnat de France amateur 2.

Agde also has a rugby club, Rugby Olympique Agathois (ROA), who play in the French Federale 1 competition.

Twin towns - sister cities

See also
 Cap d'Agde, the seaside resort of Agde
 Ancient Diocese of Agde
List of traditional Greek place names
Communes of the Hérault department

References

External links

 Agde (official site)
 Agde has one of the biggest naturist centres of Europe
 Richard Stillwell, ed. Princeton Encyclopædia of Classical Sites, 1976: "Agatha (Agde) Hérault, France"
 Recent undersea find of bronzes

Communes of Hérault
Massalian colonies
Judaism in France
Languedoc
Hérault communes articles needing translation from French Wikipedia
Phocaean colonies